Alan Richard Lloyd (22 February 1927 – 12 April 2018) was an English writer.  He is most famous for his Kine Saga fantasy books for teenagers.  He also wrote adult fiction and non-fiction, most notably on the history of the British monarchy.  His adult work is published under the name Alan Lloyd whilst children's work is published under A.R. Lloyd

Career
Lloyd was born in London, and studied drawing and painting at the Kingston School of Art before being called up to the army in 1945.  He started his writing career at the Jersey Evening Post and worked as a freelance journalist before becoming a full-time writer in 1962.  His first book, published by Longmans in 1964 was The Drums of Kumasi a non fiction account of the Ashanti Wars.  This was followed in 1966 by The Year of the Conqueror (published as The Making of the King 1066 in the USA), a study of the events and people leading up to the Norman invasion of England in 1066.  Further non-fiction work followed on the history of Spain, George III, King John and the Zulu War.  His first fiction work, The Eighteenth Concubine was published in 1972, and Kine, the first of his Kine Saga novels was published in 1982.

Personal life
Lloyd was married with one son.  He is currently published by HarperCollins.

He died on 12 April 2018 at the age of 91.

Works

 The Year of the Conqueror, London, England: Longman, 1966.
 Marathon: The Crucial Battle that Created Western Democracy, Great Britain: Souvenir Press, 1973.
 Kine (aka Marshworld) (as A.R. Lloyd), Great Britain: Hamlyn, 1982.
 The Last Otter (as A.R. Lloyd), Great Britain: Hutchinson & Co., 1984.
 The Farm Dog (as A.R. Lloyd), Great Britain: Arrow, 1986.
 Witchwood : Kine Saga Volume 2, Great Britain: Muller, 1989.
 Dragon Pond : Kine Saga Volume 3, Great Britain: Muller, 1990.
 Wingfoot (as A.R. Lloyd), London, England: Harper Collins, 1993.

References

External links 

1927 births
2018 deaths
British journalists
British writers
Writers from London